Baguio Wong Bik Yiu is a former table tennis player from Hong Kong. From 1952 to 1956 she won several medals in singles, doubles, and team events in the Asian Table Tennis Championships.

See also
 List of table tennis players

References

Hong Kong female table tennis players
Asian Games silver medalists for Hong Kong
Asian Games medalists in table tennis
Table tennis players at the 1958 Asian Games
Table tennis players at the 1962 Asian Games
Medalists at the 1958 Asian Games
Medalists at the 1962 Asian Games